Ellen Jane Clark-King ( Clark; born 1962) is a British-Canadian Anglican priest and academic. Since 2020, she has served as Dean of King's College London.

Early life and education
Ellen Jane Clark was born in 1962. From 1982 to 1985, she studied history at Newnham College, Cambridge, graduating with a Bachelor of Arts (BA) degree: as per tradition, her BA was promoted to a Master of Arts (MA Cantab) degree. From 1989 to 1992, she trained for ordination and studied theology at Ripon College Cuddesdon. She continued her studies in Christian spirituality at the University of London, graduating with a Master of Arts (MA) degree in 1999. She then studied for a Doctor of Philosophy (PhD) degree at Lancaster University, which she completed in 2003 with a doctoral thesis titled "Sacred hearts: feminist theology interrogated by the voices of working-class women".

Ordained ministry and career
Clark-King was made a deacon in the Church of England in 1992. Following the volte to allow women to be ordained as priests in the Church of England, she was ordained to the priesthood in 1994 during a service at Hereford Cathedral. She served her curacy in a multi-church parish in the Diocese of Hereford from 1992 to 1995. Then, from 1995 to 2000, she was fellow and chaplain of Sidney Sussex College, Cambridge. In 2000, she moved to the Diocese of Newcastle, where she became a doctoral student and non-stipendiary minister. She was additionally assistant diocesan director of ordinands from 2001 to 2005.

In 2005, Clark-King left the United Kingdom for the Anglican Church of Canada: she was looking for an inclusive church that was welcoming of LGBTQ clergy and accepted same-sex marriage. She served as associate pastor of Christ Church Cathedral, Vancouver between 2005 and 2012. She was additionally Archdeacon of Burrard from 2007 to 2014. From 2012 to 2014 and from 2015 to 2016, she was cathedral vicar of Christ Church Cathedral, Vancouver. For the 2014/15 academic year, she was director for Anglican formation at the Vancouver School of Theology. She took Canadian citizenship during her time in the country.

In December 2016, she moved to the United States, where she became executive pastor and canon for social justice at Grace Cathedral, San Francisco in the Episcopal Diocese of California. She was promoted to vice-dean in September 2019. Having returned to the United Kingdom, she has been Dean of King's College London since December 2020: this is the most senior cleric of the university, and is tasked with overseeing the spiritual development and welfare of all its students and staff. She is the first woman to hold the post in the almost two centuries of the college's existence.

Personal life
She is married to Jeremy Clark-King, a fellow Anglican priest. Jonathan Clark, an Anglican bishop, is her brother.

Selected works

References

1962 births
Living people
Alumni of Newnham College, Cambridge
Alumni of the University of London
Alumni of Ripon College Cuddesdon
Alumni of Lancaster University
20th-century Church of England clergy
21st-century Church of England clergy
Anglican Church of Canada archdeacons
Fellows of Sidney Sussex College, Cambridge
Academic staff of the Vancouver School of Theology